Ketchenery (Kötçnr) is a rural locality (a settlement) and the administrative center of Ketchenerovsky District of the Republic of Kalmykia, Russia. Population:

References

Notes

Sources

Rural localities in Kalmykia
Ketchenerovsky District